Billboard Top Hits: 1987 is a compilation album released by Rhino Records in 1994, featuring ten hit recordings from 1987.

The track lineup includes six songs that reached number one on the Billboard Hot 100 chart, with the remaining four songs ("C'est La Vie", "I Heard a Rumour", "Don't Dream It's Over" and "The Lady in Red") each reaching the top five on the chart.

Track listing

Track information and credits were taken from the album's liner notes.

References

1994 compilation albums
Billboard Top Hits albums